Edwin "Ed" Searcy (born April 17, 1952) is a retired American professional basketball player.

References 

1952 births
Living people
Basketball players from New York City
Boston Celtics players
New Orleans Jazz draft picks
Small forwards
St. John's Red Storm men's basketball players
American men's basketball players